Walter R. Borneman (born January 5, 1952), is an American  historian and lawyer.  He is the author of well-known popular books on 18th and 19th century United States history.

Education 
He  received his B.A. in 1974 from Western State College of Colorado, and received an M.A. in history there in 1975  for a thesis on "Irwin : silver camp of the Ruby Mountains"; in 1981 he received a J.D. degree from the University of Denver, and practiced law.

Career 
In May 2012, his work The Admirals: Nimitz, Halsey, Leahy, and King--the 5-star Admirals Who Won the War at Sea was published by Little, Brown and Co. It won the 2013 Samuel Eliot Morison Award for Naval Literature. In April, 2009 Random House Trade Paperbacks published his book on our eleventh president, James K. Polk, Polk:The Man Who Transformed the Presidency and America.

He also wrote the book, American Spring which covers the Revolutionary War from its onset to the Battle of Bunker Hill.  His latest book is MacArthur at War: World War II in the Pacific.

He has also written a number of books about mountaineering in Colorado, where he currently lives.

His works

History
Borneman, Walter R. Iron Horse: America's Race to Bring the Railroads West. New York: Back Bay Books, 2014.
Borneman, Walter R. Rival Rails: The Race to Build America's Greatest Transcontinental Railroad. New York: Random House, 2010.
Review, Los Angeles Times - Oct 3, 2010
Review BusinessWeek - Oct 20, 2010
Borneman, Walter R. Polk: The Man Who Transformed the Presidency and America. New York: Random House, 2008  
Review Wall Street Journal Online - May 16, 2008
Borneman, Walter R. The French and Indian War: Deciding the Fate of North America. New York: HarperCollins Publishers, 2006.  .
Review, The New York Times book review. (December 17, 2006): 14
Review, Providence Journal - Jan 28, 2007
Borneman, Walter R. 1812: The War That Forged a Nation. New York: HarperCollins Publishers, 2004. .
Borneman, Walter R. Alaska: Saga of a Bold Land. New York: HarperCollins, 2003.
 Translated into Russian as Borneman, Walter R, V V. Monakhov, and L A. Rusova. Сага о земле Аляска / Saga o zemle Ali︠a︡ska. Vladivostok: Dalʹnauka, 2009. OCLC 704059097.
Review, Juneau Empire - Apr 13, 2003

Colorado
Borneman, Walter R. and Lampert, Lyndon J. A Climbing Guide to Colorado’s Fourteeners: The Classic Guide to Colorado's Fourteeners,  Boulder, CO: Pruett Publishing Company, 1994.

References

External links

Living people
1952 births
Western Colorado University alumni
University of Denver alumni
Colorado lawyers
American male writers
American historians